Harry Abbott (born 1883) was a footballer who played in the Football League for Bolton Wanderers and in the Southern League for Swindon Town. He usually played inside right.

References

English footballers
Bolton Wanderers F.C. players
Blackburn Rovers F.C. players
Swindon Town F.C. players
Queens Park Rangers F.C. players
English Football League players
1883 births
Padiham F.C. players
Year of death missing
Association football inside forwards